The 2009–10 Cypriot Second Division was the 55th season of the Cypriot second-level football league. It started in September 2009 and finished in May 2010. Alki Larnaca won their 4th title.

Team Changes from 2008–09

Teams promoted to 2009–10 Cypriot First Division
 Ermis Aradippou
 Aris Limassol
 Nea Salamina

Teams relegated from 2008–09 Cypriot First Division
 Alki Larnaca
 AEK Larnaca
 Atromitos Yeroskipou

Teams promoted from Cypriot Third Division 2008–09
 Champions: Akritas Chlorakas
 Runners-up: Frenaros FC, Othellos Athienou

Teams relegated to Cypriot Third Division 2009–10
 Chalkanoras Idaliou
 THOI Lakatamia
 Ethnikos Assia

Overview

Personnel and stadia

League table

Promotion group

See also
 2009–10 Cypriot First Division
 2009–10 Cypriot Cup

Sources

Cypriot Second Division seasons
2009–10 in Cypriot football
Cyprus